There are several rivers named Pacu River in Brazil:

 Pacu River (Amajari River tributary)
 Pacu River (Catrimani River tributary)
 Pacu River (Pará)

See also
 Pacu (disambiguation)